Jean Marais (born 19 July 1992) is a South African first class cricketer. He was included in the Boland cricket team squad for the 2015 Africa T20 Cup.

References

External links
 

1992 births
Living people
South African cricketers
Boland cricketers
Cricketers from Pretoria
Wicket-keepers